Boyd River, a perennial stream that is part of the Clarence River catchment, is located in the Northern Tablelands district of New South Wales, Australia.

Course
Formed by the confluence of the Sara River and the Guy Fawkes River, Boyd River rises within Guy Fawkes River National Park and Chaelundi National Park, below the Dorrigo Plateau within the Great Dividing Range, east southeast of Glen Innes, and flows generally to the north and east, joined by one minor tributary towards its confluence with Nymboida River, at Buccarumbi, west of Coutts Crossing. The river descends  over its  course.

See also

 Rivers of New South Wales

References

External links

 

Rivers of New South Wales
New England (New South Wales)
Northern Tablelands